Thomas Meiklejohn Dickson (9 June 1888 – 9 April 1958) was an Australian rules footballer who played with Geelong in the Victorian Football League (VFL).

See also
 1911 Adelaide Carnival

Notes

References
 
 Football: T. Dickson, Geelong to Y.M.C.A. (Sydney), The Age, (Thursday, 6 May 1909), p.8.
 Thomas Dickson, at New South Wales Australian Football History Society.

External links 

1888 births
1958 deaths
Australian rules footballers from Victoria (Australia)
Geelong Football Club players
People educated at Geelong College